Oleksiy Viktorovych Sereda (born 25 December 2005) is a Ukrainian diver. He is the 2019 European champion in the 10 metre platform event.

Career 
Sereda made his Ukrainian national team debut in 2019, at the age of 13. At the World Championships he placed 4th in both individual and synchronized (with Oleh Serbin) dives on 10m platform. As a result, he qualified for the 2020 Summer Olympics in individual competitions.

Sereda became the youngest ever Europe champion on 11 August 2019, after winning gold in the individual 10 metre platform competition at the 2019 European Diving Championships. He also won a silver medal with his partner Oleh Serbin in synchronized diving.
At the 2020 Olympics in Tokyo he finished 6th in the Men's 10 metre platform event.

References 

European champions for Ukraine
Ukrainian male divers
Living people
2005 births
Sportspeople from Mykolaiv
Divers at the 2020 Summer Olympics
Olympic divers of Ukraine
World Aquatics Championships medalists in diving